The Metropolitan City of Palermo is a metropolitan city in Sicily, Italy. Its capital is the city of Palermo. It replaced the Province of Palermo and comprises the city of Palermo and other 82 municipalities (comuni).

History
It was first created by the reform of local authorities (Law 142/1990) and then established by regional law on 15 August 2015.

Geography

Territory
The Metropolitan City faces the Tyrrhenian Sea on the north, while on the west it is bordered by the province of Trapani, on the south by the province of Agrigento and by that of Caltanissetta, to the east by the Metropolitan City of Messina and the province of Enna. 

The island of Ustica is also included in the metropolitan territory.

Municipalities 
The Metropolitan City includes 82 comuni (municipalities):

Alia
Alimena
Aliminusa
Altavilla Milicia
Altofonte
Bagheria
Balestrate
Baucina
Belmonte Mezzagno
Blufi
Bisacquino
Bolognetta
Bompietro
Borgetto
Caccamo
Caltavuturo
Campofelice Di Fitalia
Campofelice Di Roccella
Campofiorito
Camporeale
Capaci
Carini
Castelbuono
Casteldaccia
Castellana Sicula
Castronovo di Sicilia
Cefalà Diana
Cefalù
Cerda
Chiusa Sclafani
Ciminna
Cinisi
Collesano
Contessa Entellina
Corleone
Ficarazzi
Gangi
Geraci Siculo
Giardinello
Giuliana 
Godrano
Gratteri
Isnello
Isola delle Femmine
Lascari
Lercara Friddi
Marineo
Mezzojuso
Misilmeri
Monreale
Montelepre
Montemaggiore Belsito
Palazzo Adriano
Palermo
Partinico
Petralia Soprana
Petralia Sottana
Piana degli Albanesi
Polizzi Generosa
Pollina
Prizzi
Roccamena
Roccapalumba
San Cipirello
San Giuseppe Jato
San Mauro Castelverde
Santa Cristina Gela
Santa Flavia
Sciara
Scillato
Sclafani Bagni
Termini Imerese
Terrasini
Torretta
Trabia
Trappeto
Ustica
Valledolmo
Ventimiglia di Sicilia
Vicari
Villabate
Villafrati

Government

List of Metropolitan Mayors of Palermo

Transport
The Metropolitan City is served by three motorways, two of which start in Palermo: A19 to Catania and Termini Imerese; A20, departing from the former and leading to Messina; and A29, to Mazara del Vallo and Trapani.

Railroads include the Palermo-Messina and the Palermo-Catania.

There are two airports: Palermo-Boccadifalco and Palermo Punta Raisi.

References

External links

 Metropolitan City of Palermo official website

Palermo